Field hockey at the 2023 Central American and Caribbean Games will be held from 23 June to 8 July 2023 in Santo Domingo, Dominican Republic. Due to infrastructure and calendar issues the field hockey event was relocated from San Salvador, El Salvador to Santo Domingo in the Dominican Republic.

The top two teams in each tournament will qualify for the 2023 Pan American Games.

Qualification
The host country, the top five teams from the previous edition of the Central American and Caribbean Games and the top two teams from the qualifying competition qualified for the 2023 edition.

Men's qualification

Women's qualification

References

External links

2023 Central American and Caribbean Games events
Qualification tournaments for the 2023 Pan American Games
Central American and Caribbean Games
2023
2023 Central American and Caribbean Games